Senator Nye may refer to:

Edd Nye (born 1932), North Carolina State Senate
Gerald Nye (1892–1971),  U.S. Senator from North Dakota
James W. Nye (1815–1876),  U.S. Senator from Nevada
Mark Nye (politician) (born 1945), Idaho State Senate
Ray J. Nye (1871–1937), Wisconsin State Senate